Zip, the Dodger is a 1914 short comedy film directed by and starring Fatty Arbuckle.

Cast
 Roscoe 'Fatty' Arbuckle

See also
 Fatty Arbuckle filmography

References

External links

1914 films
Films directed by Roscoe Arbuckle
American silent short films
1914 comedy films
1914 short films
American black-and-white films
Silent American comedy films
American comedy short films
1910s American films